Ivan Ivanovych Bilyi (born 27 January 1988) is a Ukrainian professional footballer who plays as a centre-back.

Career 
Bilyi is the product of the Sportive Schools in Lviv: UFK and Karpaty. His coach was Oleh Naduda.

He signed a contract with FC Lviv in 2008, but made his debut for the first team only in a match against FC Arsenal Bila Tserkva on 3 April 2010.

In 2019, Bilyi joined Armenian club Lokomotiv Yerevan.

Personal life 
His younger brother Vasyl Bilyi is also a professional football player.

References

External links
 
 
 

1988 births
Living people
People from Truskavets
Ukrainian footballers
Association football defenders
FC Arsenal-Kyivshchyna Bila Tserkva players
FC Lviv players
MFC Mykolaiv players
FC Sevastopol players
FC Desna Chernihiv players
FC Lviv-2 players
FC Poltava players
FC Stal Kamianske players
FC Sevastopol-2 players
FC Arsenal Kyiv players
FC Rukh Lviv players
FC Hirnyk-Sport Horishni Plavni players
FC Lokomotiv Yerevan players
FC VPK-Ahro Shevchenkivka players
FC Olimpik Donetsk players
Ukrainian First League players
Ukrainian Second League players
Armenian First League players
Ukrainian expatriate footballers
Expatriate footballers in Armenia
Ukrainian expatriate sportspeople in Armenia
Sportspeople from Lviv Oblast